Toni Androić (born 28 December 1991 in Pula) is a tennis player from Croatia.

He was in the main draw of the 2011 Croatia Open with his partner Borut Puc. He is working with Goran Prpić. In 2012, he was part of the HTK Zagreb team that won the national tennis championship.

Career statistics

Singles titles (2)

Sources

External links
 
 

1991 births
Living people
Sportspeople from Pula
Tennis players from Zagreb
Croatian male tennis players
21st-century Croatian people